Drogon is a HTTP application framework written in C++, supporting either C++17 or C++14 with Boost. The name Drogon comes from the dragon named Drogon in the TV series Game of Thrones.

In May 2020, Drogon has won the first place in the TechEmpower benchmark Round 19 Composite framework score.

References

External links
 

C++ libraries
Free software programmed in C++
Web frameworks